Toptable (styled toptable) was an online restaurant booker covering the UK as well as major cities in Europe and New York City established in 2000 and bought by OpenTable in 2010.

History
Toptable was founded in 2000 by entrepreneur Karen Hanton for restaurant owners to advertise their venues and book customers directly. Toptable sat over 1.5 million diners in 2006 when it completed its first full year.

Toptable lists more than 5,000 restaurants in the UK, plus Paris, Dublin, and New York City, providing online menus, reviews and 360° images of each restaurant. Diners can read and compare information about restaurants before their table booking online. Today, 2.3 million visitors view the Toptable website each month and, in February 2010, a dedicated Toptable iPhone app was launched.

The toptable Android app has been available, at least since Sep 2013

Toptable also provides a restaurant booking engine for Time Out, British Airways, The Guardian, The Times Online, Visit London and View London.

In 2006 toptable bought City Eating, incorporating London Eating for an undisclosed sum.

Investors in Toptable include football manager Sir Alex Ferguson, celebrity chef Gary Rhodes and Diageo. In September 2010, toptable was acquired by competitor OpenTable for approximately US$55 million.

References

External links
 OpenTable (ex. Toptable) official website

Online retailers of the United Kingdom
Internet properties established in 2000
Online food ordering
2010 mergers and acquisitions
2010 disestablishments in the United Kingdom